Charlotte Townshend, Viscountess Townshend (died 3 September 1770), suo jure 16th Baroness Ferrers of Chartley and 7th Baroness Compton, known as Lady Charlotte Compton until 1749 and as Lady Ferrers of Chartley from 1749 to 1764, was a British peeress.

Charlotte was the only surviving child of James Compton, 5th Earl of Northampton, and his wife Elizabeth Shirley, suo jure 15th Baroness Ferrers of Chartley. The barony of Ferrers of Chartley had fallen into abeyance on her mother's death in 1741. However, in 1749, the abeyance was terminated in Charlotte's favour, and she became the 16th Baroness. In 1754, she also succeeded her father in the barony of Compton.

In 1751, Charlotte married the Hon. George Townshend, later fourth Viscount Townshend and first Marquess Townshend. When he succeeded in the viscountcy in 1764, she became known as Viscountess Townshend. Charlotte died in September 1770 and was succeeded in the two baronies by her eldest son George, who was created Earl of Leicester in 1784 and later succeeded as second Marquess Townshend. Her husband survived her by over 30 years and died in 1807.

See also
Marquess of Northampton
Marquess Townshend

Notes

References
Kidd, Charles & Williamson, David (editors). Debrett's Peerage and Baronetage (1990 edition). New York: St Martin's Press, 1990, 

|-

1770 deaths
07
16
English viscountesses
Daughters of British earls
Ferrers of Chartley, Charlotte Townshend, 16th Baroness
Charlotte
Year of birth unknown